Brian M. Ashe (born April 23, 1963) is an American politician who represents the 2nd Hampden District in the Massachusetts House of Representatives and was a member of the Longmeadow, Massachusetts Select Board from 2001 to 2008. He is the son of Donald E. Ashe, Hampden County Register of Deeds.

See also
 2019–2020 Massachusetts legislature
 2021–2022 Massachusetts legislature

References

Democratic Party members of the Massachusetts House of Representatives
People from Longmeadow, Massachusetts
Westfield State University alumni
Living people
1963 births
21st-century American politicians